The Einstein solid is a model of a crystalline solid that contains a large number of independent three-dimensional quantum harmonic oscillators of the same frequency. The independence assumption is relaxed in the Debye model.

While the model provides qualitative agreement with experimental data, especially for the high-temperature limit, these oscillations are in fact phonons, or collective modes involving many atoms. Albert Einstein was aware that getting the frequency of the actual oscillations would be difficult, but he nevertheless proposed this theory because it was a particularly clear demonstration that quantum mechanics could solve the specific heat problem in classical mechanics.

Historical impact 
The original theory proposed by Einstein in 1907 has great historical relevance. The heat capacity of solids as predicted by the empirical Dulong–Petit law was required by classical mechanics, the specific heat of solids should be independent of temperature. But experiments at low temperatures showed that the heat capacity changes, going to zero at absolute zero. As the temperature goes up, the specific heat goes up until it approaches the Dulong and Petit prediction at high temperature.

By employing Planck's quantization assumption, Einstein's theory accounted for the observed experimental trend for the first time. Together with the photoelectric effect, this became one of the most important pieces of evidence for the need of quantization. Einstein used the levels of the quantum mechanical oscillator many years before the advent of modern quantum mechanics.

Heat capacity
For a thermodynamic approach, the heat capacity can be derived using different statistical ensembles. All solutions are equivalent at the thermodynamic limit.

Microcanonical ensemble 

The heat capacity of an object at constant volume V is defined through the internal energy U as

, the temperature of the system, can be found from the entropy

To find the entropy consider a solid made of  atoms, each of which has 3 degrees of freedom. So there are  quantum harmonic oscillators (hereafter SHOs for "Simple Harmonic Oscillators").

Possible energies of an SHO are given by

or, in other words, the energy levels are evenly spaced and one can define a quantum of energy

which is the smallest and only amount by which the energy of an SHO is increased. Next, we must compute the multiplicity of the system. That is, compute the number of ways to distribute  quanta of energy among  SHOs. This task becomes simpler if one thinks of distributing  pebbles over  boxes

or separating stacks of pebbles with  partitions

or arranging  pebbles and  partitions

The last picture is the most telling. However, if partition #3 and partition #5 trade places, no one would notice. The same argument goes for quanta. To obtain the number of possible distinguishable arrangements one has to divide the total number of arrangements by the number of indistinguishable arrangements. There are  identical quanta arrangements, and  identical partition arrangements. Therefore, multiplicity of the system is given by

which, as mentioned before, is the number of ways to deposit  quanta of energy into  oscillators. Entropy of the system has the form

 is a huge number—subtracting one from it has no overall effect whatsoever:

With the help of Stirling's approximation, entropy can be simplified:

Total energy of the solid is given by

since there are q energy quanta in total in the system in addition to the ground state energy of each oscillator. Some authors, such as Schroeder, omit this ground state energy in their definition of the total energy of an Einstein solid.

We are now ready to compute the temperature

Elimination of q between the two preceding formulas gives for U:

The first term is associated with zero point energy and does not contribute to specific heat. It will therefore be lost in the next step.

Differentiating with respect to temperature to find  we obtain:

or

Although the Einstein model of the solid predicts the heat capacity accurately at high temperatures, and in this limit

,

which is equivalent to Dulong–Petit law.

Nevertheless, the heat capacity noticeably deviates from experimental values at low temperatures. See Debye model for how to calculate accurate low-temperature heat capacities.

Canonical ensemble
Heat capacity is obtained through the use of the canonical partition function of a simple quantum harmonic oscillator.

where

substituting this into the partition function formula yields

This is the partition function of one harmonic oscillator. Next, let's compute the average energy of each oscillator

where

Therefore,

Heat capacity of one oscillator is then

Up to now, we calculated the heat capacity of a unique degree of freedom, which has been modeled as a quantum harmonic. One thus obtains

which is algebraically identical to the formula derived in the previous section.

The quantity  has the dimensions of temperature and is a characteristic property of a crystal. It is known as the Einstein temperature. Hence, the Einstein crystal model predicts that the energy and heat capacities of a crystal are universal functions of the dimensionless ratio . Similarly, the Debye model predicts a universal function of the ratio , where  is the Debye temperature.

Limitations and succeeding model 
In Einstein's model, the specific heat approaches zero exponentially fast at low temperatures. This is because all the oscillations have one common frequency. The correct behavior is found by quantizing the normal modes of the solid in the same way that Einstein suggested. Then the frequencies of the waves are not all the same, and the specific heat goes to zero as a  power law, which matches experiment. This modification is called the Debye model, which appeared in 1912.

See also
Kinetic theory of solids

References

External links
.

Condensed matter physics
Albert Einstein